A gubernatorial election was held on 22 October 2000 to elect the next governor of , a prefecture of Japan in the Chūbu region of the main island of Honshu.

Candidates 
Yukio Hirayama, 56, incumbent since 1992, endorsed by LDP, DPJ, NK, LP and SDP.
Ichizo Kobayashi, 64, former chief of the Urban Development Bureau of the Niigata prefecture.
Shouji Tagashi, backed by the JCP.

Results

See also 
 新潟県知事一覧|新潟県知事一覧|新潟県知事一覧 (Japanese Wikipedia)

References 

2000 elections in Japan
Niigata gubernational elections